In mathematics, the logarithmic norm is a real-valued functional on operators, and is derived from either an inner product, a vector norm, or its induced operator norm. The logarithmic norm was independently introduced by Germund Dahlquist and Sergei Lozinskiĭ in 1958, for square matrices. It has since been extended to nonlinear operators and unbounded operators as well. The logarithmic norm has a wide range of applications, in particular in matrix theory, differential equations and numerical analysis. In the finite-dimensional setting, it is also referred to as the matrix measure or the Lozinskiĭ measure.

Original definition

Let  be a square matrix and  be an induced matrix norm.

The matrix norm  is always positive if , but the logarithmic norm  may also take negative values, e.g. when  is negative definite. Therefore, the logarithmic norm does not satisfy the axioms of a norm. The name logarithmic norm, which does not appear in the original reference, seems to originate from estimating the logarithm of the norm of solutions to the differential equation 

This is expressed by the differential inequality 

where  is the upper right Dini derivative. Using logarithmic differentiation the differential inequality can also be written

showing its direct relation to Grönwall's lemma. In fact, it can be shown that the norm of the state transition matrix  associated to the differential equation  is bounded by

for all .

Alternative definitions

If the vector norm is an inner product norm, as in a Hilbert space, then the logarithmic norm is the smallest number  such that for all  

Unlike the original definition, the latter expression also allows  to be unbounded. Thus differential operators too can have logarithmic norms, allowing the use of the logarithmic norm both in algebra and in analysis. The modern, extended theory therefore prefers a definition based on inner products or duality. Both the operator norm and the logarithmic norm are then associated with extremal values of quadratic forms as follows:

Properties

Basic properties of the logarithmic norm of a matrix include:
 
 
  for scalar 
 
 
  where  is the maximal real part of the eigenvalues of 
  for

Example logarithmic norms

The logarithmic norm of a matrix can be calculated as follows for the three most common norms. In these formulas,  represents the element on the th row and th column of a matrix .

Applications in matrix theory and spectral theory

The logarithmic norm is related to the extreme values of the Rayleigh quotient. It holds that

and both extreme values are taken for some vectors . This also means that every eigenvalue  of  satisfies
.
More generally, the logarithmic norm is related to the numerical range of a matrix.

Such matrices have inverses. The inverse of a negative definite matrix is bounded by

Both the bounds on the inverse and on the eigenvalues hold irrespective of the choice of vector (matrix) norm. Some results only hold for inner product norms, however. For example, if  is a rational function with the property

then, for inner product norms,

Thus the matrix norm and logarithmic norms may be viewed as generalizing the modulus and real part, respectively, from complex numbers to matrices.

Applications in stability theory and numerical analysis

The logarithmic norm plays an important role in the stability analysis of a continuous dynamical system . Its role is analogous to that of the matrix norm for a discrete dynamical system .

In the simplest case, when  is a scalar complex constant , the discrete dynamical system has stable solutions when , while the differential equation has stable solutions when . When  is a matrix, the discrete system has stable solutions if . In the continuous system, the solutions are of the form . They are stable if  for all , which follows from property 7 above, if . In the latter case,  is a Lyapunov function for the system.

Runge-Kutta methods having this property are called A-stable.

Retaining the same form, the results can, under additional assumptions, be extended to nonlinear systems as well as to semigroup theory, where the crucial advantage of the logarithmic norm is that it discriminates between forward and reverse time evolution and can establish whether the problem is well posed. Similar results also apply in the stability analysis in control theory, where there is a need to discriminate between positive and negative feedback.

Applications to elliptic differential operators

In connection with differential operators it is common to use inner products and integration by parts. In the simplest case we consider functions satisfying  with inner product

Then it holds that

where the equality on the left represents integration by parts, and the inequality to the right is a Sobolev inequality. In the latter, equality is attained for the function , implying that the constant  is the best possible. Thus

for the differential operator , which implies that

Thus, if  is strongly elliptic, then , and is invertible given proper data.

If a finite difference method is used to solve , the problem is replaced by an algebraic equation . The matrix  will typically inherit the ellipticity, i.e., showing that  is positive definite and therefore invertible.

These results carry over to the Poisson equation as well as to other numerical methods such as the Finite element method.

Extensions to nonlinear maps

For nonlinear operators the operator norm and logarithmic norm are defined in terms of the inequalities

For nonlinear operators that are Lipschitz continuous, it further holds that

If  is differentiable and its domain  is convex, then
   and   

An operator satisfying  is called contractive. This extension offers many connections to fixed point theory, and critical point theory.

The theory becomes analogous to that of the logarithmic norm for matrices, but is more complicated as the domains of the operators need to be given close attention, as in the case with unbounded operators. Property 8 of the logarithmic norm above carries over, independently of the choice of vector norm, and it holds that

which quantifies the Uniform Monotonicity Theorem due to Browder & Minty (1963).

References

Matrix theory